The Lincoln Town Car is a model line of full-size luxury sedans that was marketed by the Lincoln division of the American automaker Ford Motor Company. Deriving its name from a limousine body style, Lincoln marketed the Town Car from 1981 to 2011, with the nameplate previously serving as the flagship trim of the Lincoln Continental. Produced across three generations for 30 model years, the Town Car was marketed directly against luxury sedans from Cadillac and Chrysler.

Marketed nearly exclusively as a four-door sedan (a two-door sedan was offered for 1981 only), many examples of the Town Car were used for fleet and livery (limousine) service. From 1983 to its 2011 discontinuation, the Town Car was the longest car produced by Ford worldwide, becoming the longest mass-production car sold in North America from 1997 to 2011. While not a direct successor of the Town Car, the Lincoln MKS would become the longest American sedan until 2016 (overtaken by the Cadillac CT6).

From 1980 until 2007, the Lincoln Town Car was assembled in Wixom, Michigan, (Wixom Assembly) alongside the Lincoln Continental, LS, and Mark VI, VII, and VIII. After that factory closed, Town Car production moved to Southwold, Ontario, (St. Thomas Assembly) alongside the similar Ford Crown Victoria and the Mercury Grand Marquis. That factory was closed in September 2011; the final Lincoln Town Car came off the assembly line on August 29, 2011.

Within the Lincoln model line, the Town Car was not directly replaced; the nameplate was used from 2012 to 2019 to denote livery/limousine/hearse variants of the Lincoln MKT. For 2017, the revived Continental replaced the MKS, closely matching the Town Car in wheelbase and width.

Background

Etymology 
In the 1920s, a town car was a body design typically used for limousines. The description originated from the horse-drawn carriage that featured an open chauffeur's compartment with a fixed roof for the passengers. During that era, the fixed rear roof horse-drawn carriage became a limousine and the term "de Ville" in French meant "for town (use)". In 1922, Edsel Ford purchased a custom-built Lincoln L-Series town car as a personal vehicle for his father, Henry Ford.

Later, the "sedan de Ville" was used as a model name by Cadillac, the primary rival to the Lincoln Continental from the 1950s to the 1990s.

Continental Town Car

1959-1960 

For 1959, Lincoln augmented its pre-existing Continental lineup with the addition of two formal sedans known as the Town Car and Limousine. Both new vehicles featured pillared construction, interiors of broadcloth and scotch-grain leather as well as deep pile carpeting. No options were offered, all equipment including air conditioning being standard; the Limousine came with a glass partition between the front and rear seats.

In place of the reverse-slant roofline used by all other Continentals (including convertibles), the Town Car/Limousine was styled with a notchback roofline with a heavily padded vinyl top and an inset rear window. In addition to the slightly restrained styling, the change in the roofline was also functional. To add rear-seat legroom, the rear seat was repositioned without any modification to the wheelbase. In the years to follow, both Imperial and Cadillac would redesign the rooflines on their own range-topping vehicles (the LeBaron and Fleetwood Sixty-Special) to appear more formal and limousine-like.

One of the rarest vehicles ever produced by Ford Motor Company, 214 Town Cars and 83 Limousines were produced from 1959 until 1960; all were painted black.

1970-1979 
For 1970, the Town Car name returned as a trim package option, including leather seating surfaces and deeper cut-pile carpeting. For 1971, a limited-edition (1500 produced) Golden Anniversary Continental Town Car commemorated the fiftieth anniversary of Lincoln. For 1972, the Town Car was introduced as a sub-model of the Lincoln Continental model line. On nearly all examples, a vinyl top covered the rear half of the roof, with a full-length configuration optional. A raised molding over the roof incorporated coach lamps on the B-pillars. For 1973, Lincoln introduced a two-door variant of the Continental Town Car, named the Town Coupe. As with the Town Car, the Town Coupe was offered with a standard vinyl roof.

As part of the 1975 redesign of the Lincoln roofline, the Town Car adopted the oval opera windows of the Mark IV coupe, with the Town Coupe given a large rectangular opera window.

The Continental Town Car proved to be a success for the division, becoming the most popular Lincoln vehicle of the 1970s (as the Mark IV and Mark V were not technically branded as Lincolns).

1980 
For 1980, Lincoln became the final American brand to market downsized full-size cars. In its redesign, the Lincoln Continental shifted from the largest production sedan in North America to a design with a smaller exterior footprint than Cadillac. The Continental Town Car returned as the top trim for the Lincoln model range; in its own downsizing, the Mark series introduced the Continental Mark VI. Though technically not badged a Lincoln, the Mark VI shared its chassis and much of the body with the Continental to reduce development and production costs.

While Lincoln had brought downsized model lines to production, from a marketing standpoint, the consolidation of the Continental, Continental Town Car/Town Coupe, and the Mark VI proved catastrophic. Following the early 1980 withdrawal of the slow-selling Lincoln Versailles, Lincoln-Mercury dealers offered three highly similar vehicles across a wide price range in the same showroom. The discontinuation of the Versailles also marked the return of Lincoln exclusively to the full-size sedan segment, leaving nothing to sell against European-brand luxury vehicles.

For the 1981 model year, Lincoln underwent a revision to transition its full-size model range from three nameplates to one, commencing a multi-year transition throughout all three Ford divisions. For 1981, the Continental went on hiatus, with Lincoln shifting the nameplate to a mid-size sedan for 1982. The Mark VI ended its model cycle in 1983; for 1984, the Mark VII exited the full-size segment, shifting the Mark Series into a different market segment.

First generation (1981–1989) 

A model year removed from the extensive downsizing of its full-size model range, the Lincoln division underwent a revision of its nameplates. Following the discontinuation of the compact Versailles sedan, Lincoln was left marketing six nearly identical vehicles (Continental, Continental Town Car, and Continental Mark VI, all offered both as two-door and four-door sedans). For 1981, the Lincoln Town Car was introduced, consolidating the Continental and Continental Town Car into a single model line slotted below the Continental Mark VI.

Identical to the 1980 Lincoln Continental, the Lincoln Town Car was offered as a two-door and four-door sedan (the Town Coupe nameplate was discontinued). Largely overshadowed by its Continental Mark VI counterpart, the Town Car two-door was discontinued for 1982. As the Continental Mark VII was introduced for 1984, Lincoln pared its full-size line down solely to the Town Car four-door sedan.

At the time of its launch, the Town Car had been slated for replacement by front-wheel drive model lines (in anticipation of further volatility in fuel prices); as fuel prices began to stabilize, demand initially rose for the model line, leading Lincoln-Mercury to produce the Town Car through the 1980s with few visible changes. Over 200,000 were sold for 1988, the highest ever for the model line. However, this increase was mostly due to an extended 1988 Town Car model year which ran from March 1987 to October 1988 instead of the usual 12-month period. Conversely, the 1987 Town Car with its shortened model year only had sales of just over 76,000. Although remaining Lincoln's top-selling model, calendar-year sales declined each year for the Town Car between 1986 and 1989. This decline was mostly blamed on its aging design and the increased popularity of the Continental which had been fully redesigned for 1988.

Chassis 
The 1980–1989 Lincoln Continental/Town Car utilized the Panther platform shared with Ford and Mercury. Delayed to the 1980 model year due to engineering issues, the Panther platform meant radically different exterior dimensions for the Lincoln models. Although extended three inches in wheelbase over its Ford/Mercury/Mark VI coupe counterparts, the 1980-1989 versions would have the shortest wheelbase ever used for a full-size Lincoln at the time (10 inches shorter than its 1979 predecessor). The 1980 Continental/Town Car was the shortest Lincoln since the Versailles. In the interest of fuel economy and handling, the Panther chassis reduced weight by up to 1400 lbs compared to the 1970-1979 full-size Lincolns. As the lightest full-size Lincoln in 40 years, the 1980 Continental/Town Car came within less than 200 pounds of the curb weight of the compact-sized Versailles. The new Panther platform meant reduced overall size, better suspension geometry, and upgraded power steering with a reduced turning diameter by over 8 feet (compared to the 1979 Lincoln Continental). For 1984, gas-pressurized shocks were added.

To achieve better Corporate Average Fuel Economy (CAFE) results, Ford discontinued the 400 and 460 big-block V8s in its full-size cars. For 1980, a 130 hp 4.9 L V8 (the 302, marketed as a "5.0 L" V8) was the standard engine. A 140 hp 351 CID V8 was available as an option. Following the introduction of the Lincoln Town Car in 1981, the  V8 became the only available engine (with the 351 becoming an option for Ford and Mercury). In Canada, the 302 V8 remained carbureted until 1985. In 1986, the 302 V8 was revised to 150 hp, following a redesign of the fuel-injection system with the introduction of sequential multi-port fuel injection. These engines are identifiable by their cast aluminum upper intake manifolds with a horizontal throttle body (vertical throttle plate); this replaced the traditional throttle body with a carburetor-style top-mounted air cleaner previously used. Introduced in the Lincoln Continental for 1980 and marketed in all Panther-platform vehicles in 1981, the Lincoln Town Car was equipped with the 4-speed AOD automatic overdrive transmission, the sole transmission of 1981-1989 examples.

All Town Cars from 1980 to 1989 featured an optional trailer towing package which included dual exhausts, a 3.55:1 limited slip differential (code 'K') and an improved cooling package for the engine as well as transmission.

Body

Exterior 
During the late 1970s, the sales of the Lincoln Continental had held steady and the Continental Mark V would go on to outsell its Cadillac Eldorado counterpart. In the development of the Lincoln Town Car, the design themes of the 1977-1979 Lincoln Continental and Mark V would both influence the exterior design of the 1980 Continental/Town Car. As with its predecessors, the Town Car features nearly flat body sides, sharp-edged fenders, and a radiator-style grille. In a major departure, hideaway headlamps gave way to exposed halogen headlamps (the first on a full-size Lincoln since 1969). Another first included fully framed door glass (retractable vent windows were now standard); in sharp contrast to its Ford and Mercury counterparts, the window frames were painted matte black. While chrome trim remained around the headlamps and window frames, in a break from Lincoln tradition, it was deleted from the top of the fenders. Though mechanically similar to the Ford LTD and Mercury Marquis (the Ford LTD Crown Victoria and Mercury Grand Marquis after 1983), the Lincoln Town Car shared visible body panels only with the Continental Mark VI. In contrast to its Ford, Mercury, and Mark VI counterparts, the rooflines of 1981-1989 Town Cars feature a vertical quarter window in the C-pillar.

After only 4,935 two-door Town Cars were sold in 1981, the body style was discontinued for 1982. In the shift from rebadging the Continental to the Lincoln Town Car for 1981, Lincoln replaced the "Continental" badging above the headlights with "Town Car", which was removed in 1984.

A padded roof was standard equipment on all Town Cars, with its design determined by trim level. On standard-trim Town Cars, a leather-grained vinyl full-length covering with center pillar coach lamps was fitted. For Signature Series and Cartier trims, a padded vinyl coach roof (covering the rear half of the roof) with a frenched (smaller) rear window opening was fitted; the coach roof was also an option on standard-trim Town Cars. On non-Cartier Town Cars, a full-length cloth (canvas) roof was an option; imitating the look of a convertible, the design deleted the C-pillar quarter windows.

During the 1980s, the Lincoln Town Car would undergo several exterior revisions. For 1985, the model was given a mid-cycle facelift. In addition to (slightly) improving its aerodynamics, the design was intended to visually shorten the car (though the length was essentially unchanged). The front and rear bumpers were redesigned, better integrating them into the bodywork. The rear fascia was redesigned; distinguished by redesigned taillamps, and the trunk lid was better integrated with the rear fenders. For 1986, to meet federal regulations, a center brake light was added in the rear window. For 1988, the grille was updated with a brushed-metal panel between the taillamps, which now featured the reverse lamps.

1989 models are distinguished by special trim features including satin black paint for grille blades, trim between headlights, and amber (instead of clear) front parking lamps. The "Lincoln" front-end badging is moved from above the left headlight onto the grille and changed to a large sans-serif script. In the rear, the brushed-metal panel was given a pinstripe finish and all badging was moved from the panel onto the trunk lid. All models feature a landau roof with a smaller, more formal "frenched" rear window. All non-Cartier models also include an embedded Lincoln "star" emblems in their opera windows

Interior 
The interior of the Lincoln Town Car featured many advanced luxury options for its time. Signature Series and Cartier models featured 6-way power seats (and manual seatback recliners) for the driver and front passenger; the Lincoln Town Car adopted a split front bench seat previously seen on the Mark coupes. Several electronic features included an optional digital display trip computer showing the driver "miles to empty" and (based on driver input) an "estimated time of arrival". A keypad-based keyless entry system unlocked the vehicle through a 5-digit combination (factory-programmed or owner-programmed). Mounted above the driver's door handle, the keypad allowed the driver to lock all four doors; after entering the code, the driver could unlock the doors or release the trunk lid. Along with keyfob-based systems, the keypad system is still in use on Ford and Lincoln vehicles (as of 2021).

As part of the 1985 update, the Lincoln Town Car was the first Ford vehicle to feature a CD player as an option (as part of a 12-speaker JBL premium stereo system); while 1984 was the final year for the option of 8-track players and CB radios for the Town Car. In a functional change, the horn button was moved from the turn-signal lever to the steering wheel hub. The door trim was changed from wood to upholstery matching the seats.

For 1986, the front-seat head restraints were replaced with a taller 4-way articulating design; walnut burl trim replaced much of the satin black trim on the lower dash. For 1988, the instrument cluster was updated; for Town Cars with analog gauges, the instrument panel was given round dials in square bezels. In addition, new wood trim was added to the dashboard and steering wheel.

Trim 
At its 1980 launch, the Lincoln Town Car was offered in two trim levels, a standard/base trim and a Lincoln Town Car Signature Series (a name shared with the Mark VI, though with less exclusive features). In 1982, Lincoln adopted the Mark-Series tradition of Designer Series editions as the Cartier Edition was shifted from the Mark VI to the Town Car, becoming the top trim level; the Cartier Edition would remain part of the Town Car line through the 2003 model year.

Special editions 
Cartier Designer Edition

In 1982, in a trim level shift, the Cartier Edition was moved from the Mark Series to the Lincoln Town Car. As before, the special-edition package consisted of exclusively coordinated exterior colors and interior designs, with the Cartier logo embroidered in place of the Lincoln "star" emblem on the seats. For 1987, the package underwent a redesign with a new upholstery design and new two-tone (metallic beige) platinum added alongside the traditional platinum silver and two-tone arctic white.

Sail America Commemorative EditionThis special edition 1987 Signature Series model came in white with a blue carriage roof and had a white leather interior with blue piping and special badging. Ford Motor Company was one of the corporate sponsors of the "Sail America Foundation" syndicate, owner of the 1987 America's Cup winning yacht Stars & Stripes 87.

Special EditionThe 1988 Town Car Signature Series was available with a $2,461 'Special Edition package', which included a carriage roof (giving the appearance of a convertible top), wire-spoke aluminum wheels, JBL audio system, leather-wrapped steering wheel, and leather upholstery with contrasting-color piping. This replaced a proposed Gucci edition Town Car that had been in the works.

Gucci Edition1989 Signature Series Gucci Edition had a special blue canvas roof with fluorescent B-pillar light and a special blue badge on the C Pillar with the word signature. It was designated in the VIN as code 84.

Marketing 
For the 1985 model year, the Cadillac DeVille and Fleetwood, traditional competitors of the Lincoln Town Car, shifted to front-wheel drive platforms (although, the Fleetwood Brougham retained its rear-drive platform and styling). At the time, Lincoln marketed the larger size of the Town Car as a selling point. In response to the downsized Cadillacs, Lincoln introduced a series of advertisements in late 1985 titled "The Valet" which depicted parking attendants having trouble distinguishing Cadillacs from lesser Buicks (Electras) and Oldsmobiles (Ninety-Eights), with the question "Is that a Cadillac?" answered by the response "No, it's an Oldsmobile...or Buick." At the end, the owner of a Lincoln would appear with the line "The Lincoln Town Car, please." The commercial campaign saw the emergence of a new advertising slogan for the brand, "Lincoln. What a Luxury Car Should Be." which was used into the 1990s. The marketing campaign was unable to turn around declining Town Car sales. It was only after an all-new redesigned Town Car was introduced in 1989 for the 1990 model year that sales temporarily rebounded.

Production

Second generation (FN36/116; 1990–1997) 

After ten years on the market (nine of them as the Town Car) relatively unchanged, the Lincoln Town Car was given an extensive redesign inside and out, being launched on October 5, 1989, as a 1990 model. In a move to bring a new generation of buyers to the Lincoln brand, the Town Car adopted a far more contemporary image, bringing it in line with the Continental and Mark VII. In addition, the Town Car adopted a new range of safety and luxury features and would mark the debut of a powertrain that would see usage in a wide variety of Ford Motor Company vehicles. The Town Car was named the 1990 Motor Trend Car of the Year.

The Town Car's redesign gave the model a significant sales boost in 1990, helping Lincoln achieve record total sales that year. The second-generation Town Car became one of the best-selling full-size U.S. luxury sedans. Town Car sales quickly declined again and would drop below 100,000 in 1995 for the first time in over ten years. This decline mirrored what had been going on in the luxury car market as buyers’ tastes shifted more towards nimbler, performance-oriented models, and eventually SUVs.

Following the discontinuation of the Cadillac Fleetwood by General Motors after 1996, the Lincoln Town Car became the longest-length regular-production sedan sold in the United States.

Development 
The second-generation Town Car was developed from 1985 to 1989 under the codename FN36, at a cost of US$650 million, led by project manager John Jay. Following its downsizing to the Panther platform in 1980, the Lincoln Town Car was originally slated to be discontinued by the middle of the decade and replaced by a smaller front-wheel drive sedan; after the 1979 fuel crisis, gasoline prices were predicted to reach $2.50 per gallon and Ford Motor Company had lost $1.5 billion for 1980. However, by 1984, full-size Lincoln sales had rapidly increased, with 1984 sales up 300% over 1980. Instead of ending the product cycle of the Lincoln Town Car, Ford product planners instead chose its front-wheel drive mid-size platform (of the Ford Taurus) to become the next-generation Lincoln Continental.

In August 1985, Ford designers began sketching and constructing clay models of competing designs under lead designer Gale Halderman and Ford Group Design Vice President Jack Telnack, with a final design chosen in May 1986; two full-scale (1:1) proposals were reviewed by a four-member design committee, chaired by CEO Donald Petersen, Jack Telnack, Ford President Harold Poling, and William Clay Ford, vice-chairman. Various proposals were considered ranging from a conservative update of the existing Town Car to a European-style body in the design language of the 1988 Lincoln Continental (FN-9, designed in 1984).

The final compromise of the committee sought to keep the identity of the Town Car while introducing a contemporary vehicle for the 1990s. In the interest of fuel economy, the Lincoln Town Car was required to become more aerodynamic (reducing wind noise), but key parts of its design were integrated into its design, with its radiator-style grille, chrome trim, and opera windows. In a major design constraint, the design team was not to make any major reductions in size to the Town Car, preserving its large interior and trunk space as key marketing points to buyers.

In 1984, a second factor driving the design of the FN36 project was initiated, as the United States government introduced regulations mandating passive restraints on vehicles produced after September 1, 1989; along with automatic seat belts, out of necessity, automakers began to reconsider the use of airbags as passive restraints. By 1988, dual airbags remained nearly unused in cars sold in the United States, with the exception of the Mercedes S-Class (Mercedes-Benz W126) and the Porsche 944. To comply with the legislation, Lincoln introduced the 1988 Continental with dual airbags, becoming the first Ford Motor Company (and first domestically produced vehicle) with them standard. As adding airbags to the 1988-1989 Town Car would require a redesign of the steering column and entire dashboard, dual airbag were moved to the FN36 project, making them an intended standard feature.

In March 1986, the design freeze for the project occurred, with an intended production start of mid-1989. The second-generation Lincoln Town Car would become the first domestic Ford vehicle engineered outside of the company and constructed by foreign suppliers, with International Automotive Design of Brighton, England handling the engineering, while Japan-based Ogihara Iron Works supplying all of the Town Car body panels from its own factory near the Wixom plant. To improve quality of prototypes, project managers broke from automotive industry precedent, requiring successive hand-built prototypes to be built to production-level quality to determine the locations and causes of specific issues of tooling and manufacturing. From 1988 to 1989, the Town Car would go from over a year behind its production date to two weeks ahead of schedule.

Chassis 
To lower the development and production costs of the extensive redesign, Ford Motor Company retained the Panther platform for the Lincoln Town Car, continuing its use of rear-wheel drive. In a major change, rear air suspension (introduced as an option for all three Panther vehicles in 1988) became standard equipment on all Town Cars. For 1990, the Town Car was produced with 11-inch rear drum brakes (identical to its 1989 predecessor); for 1991, they were replaced by 10-inch solid rotor disc brakes.

Due to development delays in the Modular engine program, the 1990 Lincoln Town Car was released with the same powertrain as its predecessor: the   small block V8 engine with a 4-speed AOD overdrive automatic. In October 1990, the 302 (marketed as 5.0 L) V8 was replaced by a  4.6 L SOHC Modular V8 for 1991 models; for the 1994 model year, the optional 210 hp dual-exhaust version of the engine became standard. Shared with the Ford Crown Victoria and Mercury Grand Marquis, the SOHC version of the 4.6 L Modular V8 would see use in a number of other Ford vehicles within the Ford light-truck line, remaining in production into 2014. For 1993, the AOD transmission was converted to electronic operation, becoming the AOD-E. In 1994, along with a mid-cycle refresh, the 1995 Town Car received the higher-torque 4R70W from the Lincoln Mark VIII.

Body 
The second-generation Lincoln Town Car was designed by Gale Halderman and Ford Group Design Vice President Jack Telnack.

Exterior 
In its redesign for the 1990 model year, Lincoln stylists sought a completely new design for the Town Car. Many traditional Lincoln styling cues were heavily reworked or abandoned completely. Although the Town Car would keep its formal notchback sedan roofline, the flat-sided fenders and angular lines seen since the Continentals and Mark IIIs of the late 1960s disappeared. Stylists made the body more aerodynamic reducing drag coefficient from 0.46 to 0.36 (matching the 1988 Continental and besting the Mark VII). The 1990 Town Car still retained several styling influences, including its vertical taillights, radiator-style grille, hood ornament, alloy wheels, and vertical C-pillar window. In a move to market the Town Car to buyers of contemporary vehicles, several other changes were made. Although two-tone paint remained available (featuring a lower body accent color in gray metallic), monotone paint schemes would become increasingly standard. In a major change, a vinyl roof was no longer offered, since vinyl roofs declined in popularity among many buyers. Spoked aluminum wheels were dropped from the options list for 1990, while locking wire wheel discs remained through 1992.

In late 1992, the exterior was given a minor update with a new grille and slightly redesigned tail lamp lenses (distinguished by a "checkerboard" pattern) for 1993 models. As with the Crown Victoria and Grand Marquis, the Town Car received a larger update for the 1995 model year in late 1994 as the FN116. This facelift is distinguished by the deletion of the fixed quarter glass in the rear doors along with the redesign of the side mirrors (enlarged and changed to body-color). Although the bumper largely remained unchanged, the front fascia was updated as the headlamp clusters are changed to a clear-lens design and separated from the grille. The grille was redesigned, returning to the 1990-1992 design in a surround fitting closer to the body. The rear fascia saw the trim between the tail lamps redesigned, featuring additional running lights, while the reverse lamps were moved from the outer edges of the reflector panel to the center, beneath the lid lock cover (similar to the 1985 - 1987 models).

Interior 
In a departure from the Lincoln Continental and Mark VII, the use of the Panther platform necessitated a degree of component sharing with the Ford and Mercury counterparts. Although fitted with its own seats and door panels, the Town Car was fitted with essentially the same dashboard as the Mercury Grand Marquis (versions with digital instruments retain the instrument panel layout from 1988 to 1989). In 1993, the wood trim was changed to an orange-toned walnut. Due to its popularity (and to better separate the Town Car from its Ford/Mercury counterparts), the digital instrument panel was made standard; as such, the climate-control system was converted to a digital display. New for the 1995 model year was an integrated, voice-activated in-car cellular telephone concealed in the center armrest, which featured a speakerphone as well as a rearview mirror-mounted microphone for hands-free calling.

As part of its 1995 Mid-cycle refresh, the interior saw a greater degree of change than the exterior. To bring the design up to date (and in line with the rest of the Lincoln line), the dashboard and door panels featured a curved design, while influenced by the Mark VIII, the 6-passenger design of the Town Car precluded the adoption of a center console in the interior. To increase storage space, the dual center armrests of the front seats on Signature and Cartier models were redesigned to include storage compartments (to hold cassettes and the optional cellular telephone). The dashboard design continued into the new door panels, now with an illuminated power window and seat adjuster cluster, and a back-lit power door lock switch placed higher on the door. Releases for the trunk and fuel door were moved from the dashboard onto the lower driver's door. Redesigned seat patterns now offered an available driver and front passenger electric heat feature. The radio antenna was integrated into the rear window. Although the basic controls of the interior remained common across all Panther vehicles, the Town Car gained a model-specific instrument panel, featuring italicized readouts.

For 1996, the climate controls were again redesigned; while Cartier Designer Editions featured genuine wood trim on the dashboard and door panels. In 1997, few changes were made: the rear center armrest added a pair of cup holders, while Cartier models gained rear-seat vanity mirrors mounted in the headliner. Also in 1997, the trim level badges were moved to the front fenders in place of the "Town Car" badges. Subsequently, the rear side opera windows no longer featured their trim level engravings.

Trim 
Upon its redesign in October 1989, the Lincoln Town Car carried over its three previous trim levels: base, Signature Series, and Cartier Designer Edition. For 1991, the base trim was renamed Executive Series. From 1989 to 1996, the Lincoln Town Car was available with a factory towing package.

The Base (Executive Series from 1991MY onward) Town Car offered six-passenger seating with two bench seats, a four-speaker AM/FM stereo with cassette player, 6-way front power seats, a four-speed automatic overdrive transmission, cloth seating surfaces, fifteen-inch tires, dashboard clock, and keyless entry with Ford's SecuriCode keyless entry keypad.

The Signature Series added a digital vacuum fluorescent instrument cluster, trip computer, and standard alloy wheels. The Cartier Edition was fitted with the same features as the Signature Series, adding a JBL-branded sound system with an amplifier, a security system, alloy spoked wheels, and other details, such as cloth and leather seats. In a departure from tradition, starting in 1990, Cartier Designer Edition Town Cars were no longer available in a single color combination yearly, but in several different interior/exterior combinations. In addition, aside from gray lower body trim offered as an option for Signature Series Town Cars, Cartier Editions became the only two-tone versions of the Town Car.

Special editions 

In addition to the three standard trims of the Lincoln Town Car, various special edition option packages were produced by Lincoln (excluding dealer-produced versions).

Jack Nicklaus Signature Series (1992-1997)The Jack Nicklaus Signature Series was a special-edition option package for the Town Car Signature Series that was featured a green exterior with a white top; the interior consisted of white leather with green accents. Another version of the package was sold with a white exterior and a standard roof; the interior trim was similar, with white leather seats and green carpets and trim.

Most Jack Nicklaus editions have ornaments and wording on the exterior trimmed in gold including green and gold "Golden Bear" badges on the front fenders. Options included on the 1992 to 1997 Jack Nicklaus Signature Series included: Memory Seats with Power Lumbar/Recliner, Leather Seats and Monotone Paint.

Regatta Edition (1994)The Regatta Edition was a maritime-themed special-edition option package for the Signature Series, with approximately 1,500 produced. The package consisted of White Oxford leather seats (with optional blue seat piping), with regatta blue carpeting; the doors and instrument panel featured matching blue-color trim.

The package was often paired with a white oxford vinyl carriage roof featuring embroidery on the "C" pillar near the opera windows.

Spinnaker Edition (1995)Replacing the Regatta Edition, the Spinnaker Edition option package featured tri-coat paint, two-toned leather seats, the Spinnaker logo on the floor mats, and 16" spoked aluminum wheels.

Diamond Anniversary Edition (1996)To commemorate the 75th anniversary of Lincoln in 1996, the division sold a Diamond Anniversary Edition of the Town Car Signature Series (alongside the Continental and Mark VIII). Featuring a unique accent stripe, leather seats, wood instrument panel trim, window badging, cellular telephone, power moonroof, JBL audio system, auto electrochromatic dimming mirror with compass, and traction assist, the Diamond Anniversary Edition included nearly every available option on the Lincoln Town Car.

Cypress Edition (1996)The Cypress Edition of the Signature Series featured Cypress Gold Frost exterior paint, a two-toned leather interior, and red Cypress tree badging.

Features 
At its 1990 redesign, the Lincoln Town Car was offered with relatively few options, with nearly all features as standard equipment. On the Signature Series, the only options were leather seat trim, a moonroof, a 10-disc CD changer, a JBL sound system, a security system, and an onboard telephone.

The redesign highlighted several new features that had never been available before on the Town Car. A two-position driver's memory seat was standard on Cartier Editions (optional on Signature Series); the memory seats featured an 8-way adjustment for both seats and inflatable lumbar support. While technically a carryover feature from 1989, the Electrochromic Dimming Mirror was redesigned for the much wider rear window of the new Town Car.

A number of advances were made in the safety features available for the Lincoln Town Car, with ABS becoming an optional feature in 1990. Following the return of 4-wheel disc brakes to the Town Car in 1991 (for the first time since 1979), ABS became standard in 1992. Initially, the 1990 Town Car came with dual airbags as standard equipment. However, due to a March 14, 1990 fire at the facility where the passenger airbag's propellant was produced, the passenger airbag essentially became a delete option, with a credit on the window sticker issued for the price of the missing airbag. Upon the owner's request, for the price of the issued credit, the passenger airbag would be installed once supply became available. By the beginning of the 1992 model year, all Town Cars come equipped with dual airbags from the factory.

Production

Safety 
National Highway Traffic Safety Administration (NHTSA) 1990 Lincoln Town Car Crash Test Ratings

Frontal Driver:

Third generation (FN145; 1998–2011) 

The third generation of the Lincoln Town Car was unveiled at the 1997 New York International Auto Show, going on sale in November 1997. For the 1998 model year, all three Panther-platform sedans underwent complete exterior and interior redesigns, with the Town Car given the most extensive revision. Shifting away from the straight-lined design language used by full-size Lincoln sedans for over 35 years, the 1998 Town Car adopted the rounded exterior of the Lincoln Mark VIII and 1995 Lincoln Continental. The third-generation Town Car was introduced nearly concurrently with the Lincoln Navigator, the first SUV sold by the Lincoln division.

The third generation of the Town Car marked several major changes within Lincoln-Mercury. From 1999 to 2002, the Lincoln-Mercury division became a brand of Premier Automotive Group, a division of Ford created to manage its premium automotive brands acquired during the 1990s; following organizational difficulties (leading to Lincoln once again falling behind Cadillac in sales by 2000), Lincoln-Mercury was restored under its previous divisional structure during 2002. As part of The Way Forward, the 2007 closure of Wixom Assembly Plant was announced, initially putting the future of the Town Car at risk. To continue the Town Car, for the 2008 model year, production of the Town Car was transferred to the St. Thomas Assembly plant in Canada, alongside the Ford Crown Victoria and Mercury Grand Marquis.

Chassis 
For its redesign in the 1998 model year, the Lincoln Town Car retained the Ford Panther platform that had underpinned its predecessor. To improve the cornering stability of the Town Car, a Watt's linkage was fitted to the solid rear axle suspension (a change also seen in its Mercury and Ford counterparts). The front brake calipers were changed to a larger dual-piston design; 16-inch wheels became standard.

For 2003, the chassis of the Town Car was extensively redesigned and changes were made to the tuning of the suspension. The steering system was changed from a recirculating-ball to a rack-and-pinion configuration.

Powertrain 
In the redesign, the Lincoln Town Car carried over its Modular V8 (shared with the Crown Victoria/Grand Marquis). For the first time since its 1991 introduction, the 4.6 L SOHC V8 saw an increase in output, rising to 200 hp in Executive/Signature models; dual exhaust Town Cars produced 220 hp in Cartier trim with 239 hp in Signature Touring versions. In 2000, the V8 was retuned to 200/215 hp, rising to 220/235 hp in 2001. For 2003, the powertrain would get a final power increase, rising to 224/239 hp.

From 1997 to 2002, the Town Car used the 4R70W 4-speed automatic that was introduced in 1994. From 2003 onward, the heavier-duty 4R75W replaced it.

Body

Exterior 
While three inches shorter than its 1997 predecessor, the 1998 Town Car gained two inches in width and an inch in height (becoming the tallest Lincoln sedan in 40 years). In a major break from Lincoln styling tradition, the Town Car abandoned many of the straight-edged lines of its predecessor. Adopting styling cues of the outgoing Mark VIII and the 1995 Continental, the Town Car adopted a curved design scheme in place of the previous straight-lined body. While the radiator grille was retained, its rectangular shape was changed to oval (its waterfall pattern was adopted by the Lincoln Navigator introduced alongside it), and the hood ornament was deleted.

The curved design scheme carried further to the rear of the Town Car, in the C-pillar (losing its opera windows) into the trunklid. To differentiate from its Mercury counterpart, the Town Car switched to individual taillamps, deleting the filler panel on the trunklid; a large chrome surround was used on the trunklid to mount the license plate.

In 2001, the stretched Town Car L was introduced, with a six-inch stretch in its wheelbase. To produce the variant at a lower cost, the B-pillar was widened on 2001-2002 versions to use the existing rear door glass of the standard Town Car. In 2003, the Town Car L was redesigned, giving it model-specific doors proportioned to the longer roofline; these versions are distinguished by wider rear quarter glass in the doors.

In 2003, coinciding with the chassis redesign, the body of the Town Car underwent a number of changes. To bring it in line with contemporary Lincoln vehicles, the lower body was squared off; the oval grille was redesigned in the style of the Lincoln LS; the hood ornament made its return after a 5-year absence.

Interior 
As with its predecessors, the 1998 Lincoln Town Car visibly shares few common interior parts with its Ford and Mercury counterparts (aside from its steering column, radio, and climate controls). To improve ergonomics, power seat controls on Signature and Cartier models are relocated from the seat to door panel (Executive Series, in 1999). Seat-mounted side airbags become standard on all Town Cars for 1999. In the same year, the Executive Series regained its rear-seat center armrest (initially deleted in a cost-cutting move). A new in-vehicle telematics system, called "RESCU", included a rearview mirror with integrated microphone and SOS and roadside assistance buttons, and replaced the previous in-car telephone with a portable Motorola Timeport cellular telephone that now featured voice recognition. The system was discontinued after the 2003 model year.

For its 2003 redesign, the interior of the Lincoln Town Car saw extensive changes. To differentiate the Town Car from the Mercury Grand Marquis, the radio and climate controls were integrated into a single unit with an analog clock; the interior was given a model-specific wood trim bordered by satin metal. The redesign included new seats, distinguished by taller head restraints. Alongside the Lincoln LS, the 2003 Town Car introduced a DVD-based satellite navigation system designed by Pioneer; it was later paired with THX sound processing. On all Town Cars except for Executive Series, ultrasonic park assist was standard, alongside a power-open/close trunk lid.

For 2004, the "Soundmark" standard stereo system is redesigned to offer dual-media capability (AM/FM/cassette/CD). For 2005, for the first time since 1996, the Town Car received a redesigned steering wheel. For 2006, the instrument panel was redesigned, with the Town Car gaining a tachometer alongside its Ford and Mercury counterparts; The Town Car was one of the last American-market vehicles sold without one.

As part of the 2008 shift in assembly plants, to streamline production, Lincoln deleted or standardized many features of the Town Car, leaving only four remaining options: HID headlamps, whitewall tires, polished 18-spoke wheels (in place of 10-spoke "machine-finish" wheels), and a trunk organizer.

Trim 
At its redesign for 1998, the Lincoln Town Car was produced in three trim levels: Executive Series (primarily for fleets and livery sales), Signature Series, and Cartier Designer Edition. From 1998 to 2002, Lincoln offered the Signature Series Touring; essentially the Lincoln counterpart to the Handling and Performance Package option for the Ford Crown Victoria/Mercury Grand Marquis, the Signature Series Touring offered suspension upgrades to optimize handling.

For 2002, the Town Car line was expanded as Lincoln introduced a Premium option package for the Signature Series, Cartier, and Signature Touring; the Premium option package is distinguished by a glass sunroof.

For 2003, the Town Car was redesigned to have a new look and the Executive became the base model. The Signature was the next step up, and then the Cartier and Cartier L. A new "SoundMark" premium audio system, featuring nine premium speakers (including a rear deck-mounted subwoofer, coaxial front and rear speakers, and an amplifier), became available, and was paired with a dual-media AM/FM stereo radio with integrated cassette and CD players. A trunk-mounted CD changer was still available, though an AM/FM stereo radio with an in-dash CD player replaced the cassette-only unit (the standard sound system still featured four speakers mounted in the front doors and rear deck of the Town Car).

For 2004, several shifts were made to the model line, with the Executive becoming available solely for fleet/livery customers and the Cartier discontinued altogether. To replace the Cartier, Lincoln introduced the Town Car Ultimate. Ultimate buyers could now opt for "upgraded" leather seat trim. A touchscreen GPS navigation system radio became available for the first time, available on the new Ultimate trim. For 2005, the Ultimate was replaced by the Signature Limited (first introduced as an option in 2000) along with the Designer Series in 2006–2007. Also in 2005, Signature Limited models equipped with the GPS navigation system radio also came equipped with a new THX Certified premium audio system, adding tweeter speakers in the upper corners of the front door panels, and a more powerful amplifier, and all Town Car models could be paired with Sirius Satellite Radio, regardless of radio option. Effectively replacing the Cartier, the Designer Series offered a two-tone interior with Provence leather and adjustable head restraints; the exterior was distinguished by chrome wheels and B-pillar trim.

For 2008 through 2011, the Signature Limited became the sole trim available on the standard-wheelbase Town Car along with the long-wheelbase Signature L; the Executive Series remained in production for fleet and livery sales. The dual-media cassette and CD player radio was replaced with a six-disc, in-dash CD changer unit, and both the trunk-mounted CD changer and GPS navigation radio were discontinued, as was the THX Certified premium audio system.

Special editions 

TouringIntended to enhance the driving appeal of the Lincoln Town Car, the Touring/Touring Sedan was an option package for Signature Series Town Cars from 1998 to 2002. Essentially the Lincoln counterpart of the Ford Crown Victoria/Mercury Grand Marquis Handling and Performance Package, the Touring option package featured a dual-exhaust 239 hp V8, heavy-duty KONI shocks, revised suspension bushings, wider 16-inch wheels with 235 mm tires, a 3.55 rear-axle ratio, and revised steering tuning. Town Cars with the option package featured a black-painted grille, exterior chrome delete, black wood interior (fitted with perforated leather seats, and a JBL sound system).

Limited EditionIn 2003, Lincoln offered a Limited trim; having Limited badges on the C-pillar, fog lights, heated and memory seats, as well as Arden inserts in the rims and grille. For 2005, the Limited offered two-tone paint schemes (in addition to two-tone seats) with Limited badges on the C-pillar as well, but no fog lights.

Pro SeriesOffered in 2004, a special Pro-series badge was placed on the C-pillars; having the background of a golf course. This badge was stitched onto the front seats, in addition to having chrome 9-spoke rims and a two-tone color scheme.

25th Anniversary EditionLincoln commemorated the 25th anniversary of the Town Car by offering a 25th Anniversary Edition package on the 2006 Signature Limited. The package included chrome B-pillar and door handles, unique Eucalyptus wood applique and matching steering wheel with wood inserts, scuff plates with "25th Anniversary Edition" and "25th anniversary" badging, Provence leather individual 40/20/40 lounge seating with individual comfort, shirring, contrast piping and rear seat adjustable headrests, fog lamps, and 9-spoke chrome wheels.

Continental EditionOffered in 2010 and 2011 was the Continental Edition package; available as an option only on the Signature Limited trim. The package added Continental badging, chrome 17-inch wheels, and accents to the B-pillars. On the interior, the Continental name was embroidered on the front seats and front floor mats.

Safety 
The Lincoln Town Car was the first production sedan in the world to receive US five-star crash ratings in every category.

National Highway Traffic Safety Administration (NHTSA) 2003 Lincoln Town Car Crash Test Ratings (with side airbags)

Frontal Driver: 
Frontal Passenger: 
Side Impact (Driver): 
Side Impact (Passenger): 
Rollover: 

National Highway Traffic Safety Administration (NHTSA) 1998* Lincoln Town Car Crash Test Ratings (with side air bags)

Frontal Driver: 
Frontal Passenger: 
Side Impact (Driver): 
Side Impact (Passenger): 
Rollover: N/A

Variants

Trim level timeline

Livery variants 
Featuring a standard V8 engine, body-on-frame design, rear-wheel drive and large exterior and interior dimensions, the Town Car became popular in livery and commercial service. In commercial service, the typical Lincoln Town Car saw a life expectancy of well over 400,000 miles. Its basis on the Ford Panther chassis gave it powertrain and suspension commonality with the Mercury Grand Marquis and the Ford LTD Crown Victoria (later the Crown Victoria). This design made them durable even in the rough conditions taxi and livery cars are subjected to, and easy and cheap to repair when they did suffer damage.

The Lincoln Town Car was popular as a stretch limousine donor chassis; it was the most commonly used limousine and chauffeured car in the United States and Canada. Hearses and funeral cars were also built on the Town Car chassis, through Ford's QVM program; the chassis was modified by coachbuilders for use in the funeral business, though Cadillac has always dominated in this market.

Presidential State Car 
A 1989 Lincoln Town Car was commissioned by United States President George H. W. Bush as the Presidential State Car of the United States to succeed the 1983 Cadillac Fleetwood used during the Ronald Reagan administration. The Presidential Town Car limousine arrived in 1989 and was the state car for the entire presidency of George H. W. Bush. It was succeeded by a 1993 Cadillac Fleetwood, used by his successor, Bill Clinton. As of 2021, the 1989 Lincoln Town Car is currently the last Lincoln vehicle to have served as a Presidential State Car.

Town Car L 
A new "L" designation was used for extended-wheelbase Town Cars from 2000 to 2011. The L editions offered an additional  of rear-seat legroom, as well as remote access audio and climate controls mounted in the rear center armrest. Also included was a two-way travel switch for the front passenger seat base (a feature shared with the extended-wheelbase Jaguar XJ). The L designation was applied to the top-of-line Cartier (2000–2003), Ultimate (2004 only), and Signature (2005–2011) trim levels. Fleet buyers received it under the Executive L trim designation.

For 2000–02 versions, the "L" edition is identified by a widened B-pillar, bearing the Lincoln "star" ornament; maintaining parts commonality with the standard Town Car. The 2003-2011 "L" editions had longer rear doors, featuring wider versions of the fixed windows.

Ballistic Protection Series 
Starting in 2003, the Lincoln Town Car had been available featuring ballistic protection from the factory. Adding nearly $100,000 to the base price, the armored body and bulletproof glass raised the curb weight of the Town Car to nearly 7,000 pounds. Other changes included the suspension and brakes. Only a few dealers in the US were authorized to sell this series.

Hongqi CA7460

In China, FAW produced a licensed version of the Lincoln Town Car rebadged as the Hongqi CA7460(红旗,Red flag CA7460) and Hongqi Qijian(红旗旗舰,Flagship) from November 10, 1998 to 2005. The limousine version is currently called the Hongqi Limousine L1, L2 and L3 respectively. Pricing in 1998 was at 690,000 RMB (US$109,710) while limousines were added to the range. Pricing for the limousine variant was 1,350,000 RMB (US$214,650).

Sales

Discontinuation 
During the 2000s, in spite of declining sales, the Town Car remained one of the highest-selling American-brand luxury sedans. Outside of retail markets, it was the most used limousine and chauffeured car in the United States and Canada.

In 2006, as part of The Way Forward, Ford considered ending production of Lincoln's largest model as part of the 2007 closing of the Wixom Assembly Plant. Industry observer George Peterson said "It blows everybody’s mind that they are dropping the Town Car. Just think what Ford could do if they actually invested in a re-skin of Crown Victoria, Grand Marquis, and Town Car." Ultimately, Wixom Assembly was closed following the 2007 model year, with the production of the Town Car consolidated with the Ford Crown Victoria, Ford Crown Victoria Police Interceptor, and Mercury Grand Marquis in Canada at St. Thomas Assembly; the first Canadian-produced Town Car was assembled on January 10, 2008.

Following the 2007 model year, however, the Town Car was discontinued for retail sale in Canada, available exclusively for fleet and livery customers afterward. In 2009, the fate of all three Panther-platform models was determined when Ford announced the 2011 closure of the St. Thomas Assembly Plant. For the limousine and livery markets, Ford had promised availability of the Town Car through the 2011 model year; retail sales continued on a limited basis in the United States and for export. In 2010, Ford announced the closure of the Mercury brand at the end of the year, effectively making the Town Car the final model line sold for retail sale produced by St. Thomas Assembly (retail sales of the Crown Victoria ended after 2007).

On August 29, 2011, the final Town Car rolled off the assembly line, without any fanfare or announcement from Ford; St. Thomas Assembly produced its final vehicle (a 2012 Crown Victoria for export) on September 15, 2011.

While Lincoln has not developed a direct successor to the model line following its 2011 discontinuation, the use of the nameplate returned for 2012, denoting a variant of the Lincoln MKT designed for limousine/livery use. The MKT was discontinued after the 2019 model year without a direct replacement, marking the final use of the Town Car name; the nameplate was in use for 49 continuous years by Lincoln (30 as a distinct model line, 11 as a sub-model of the Continental, 8 of the MKT).

Awards 

The Town Car has received several awards and recognitions.

 Forbes magazine repeatedly named the Town Car one of the best cars to be chauffeured in along with other, often more expensive flagship sedans, such as the Mercedes-Benz S-Class, BMW 7 Series and Lexus LS. The Town Car Signature L features a rear seat comfort package which not only provides rear seat passengers with audio system and rear compartment climate controls, but also features a control function which allows for the rear seat occupants to move the passenger seat forward, a feature exclusive to few ultra-luxury sedans.
 In 1990, upon the introduction of the second generation Town Car, the vehicle was named Motor Trend Car of the Year. However this award was later included by Car and Driver in a list of the poorly chosen car of the year award winners. Motor Trend has changed the criteria by which it awards its highest accolade: Originally, Car of the Year awards went to the vehicle model which was the most significantly improved over the previous year's design in all respects. Currently, no such consideration is given to contenders for this award, and vehicles are considered for the award even if in their first year of production.

See also 

 Ford Crown Victoria/Police Interceptor
 Mercury Grand Marquis/Marauder
 Ford Panther platform
 Lincoln Mark Series

References

External links 

Flagship vehicles
Full-size vehicles
Limousines
Town Car
Rear-wheel-drive vehicles
Sedans
Cars introduced in 1980
1990s cars
2000s cars
2010s cars
Motor vehicles manufactured in the United States
Ford Panther platform
Cars discontinued in 2011